A list of coastal features of Whalsay island, Shetland Islands, Scotland:

Bays, cliffs, and headlands
Challister Ness
Brough Head
Clett Head
Cobrie Geo 
Conni Geo 
Flukings Bight
Gardie Geo
Gorsendi Geo
Grut Ness
Guttald Geos 
The Haa
Haa Ness
Helli Geo
Hemri Geo
Hevda 
Kirk Ness
Linga Sound
Longi Geo
Meo Ness
Roo Ness
Sefta Point
Skaw Taing
Skaw Voe
Sponger Point
Stivi Geo
Suther Ness 
Symbister Ness
Vai Voe
Yoxie Geo

Islets and stacks
Andooing Skerry
East Linga 
Flaeshans of Sandwick
Grif Skerry
Grunnels Stack
Holm of Sandwick
Inner Holm of Skaw
Isbister Holm
Mooa 
Nista 
Outer Holm of Skaw
Rumble
Sava Skerry
Skate of Marrister
Trota Stack
West Linga
Veeda Stack
Whelsiegeo Stacks

Whalsay
Lists of landforms of Scotland
Shetland-related lists